Sebastián "El Pelado" Vázquez Bernal (born September 4, 1985) is an Uruguayan professional basketball player. He currently plays for the Club Nacional de Football (basketball) club of the Liga Uruguaya de Basketball.

He represented Uruguay's national basketball team at the 2017 FIBA AmeriCup.

References

External links
 FIBA AmeriCup 2017 profile
 Latinbasket.com profile
 Real GM profile

1985 births
Living people
Small forwards
Uruguayan men's basketball players
Sportspeople from Montevideo
Club Atlético Goes basketball players
Club Nacional de Football (basketball) players